Shirayeh (also Romanized as Shīrāyeh) is a village in Reza Mahalleh Rural District, in the Central District of Rudsar County, Gilan Province, Iran. At the 2006 census, its population was 105, in 33 families.

References 

Populated places in Rudsar County